Karl Wenninger, from 1914 onwards Ritter von Wenninger, was a German Lieutenant General who commanded the XVIII Reserve Corps in World War I.

Biography

Family
Karl was the son of the Bavarian Colonel Franz Xaver Wenninger and his wife Mathilde, née Forster.

Wenninger married Kornelie Prins on July 11, 1889 in Landshut. She was the daughter of the Vice-President of the Council for the Dutch East Indies, Ary Prins. The marriage resulted in a daughter and two sons. Like their father, both sons pursued military careers. The youngest son fell as a pilot on the Western Front in 1917 , the older son Ralph initially served in the Imperial German Navy as a submarine commander and achieved the rank of Luftwaffe General in World War II. Like his father, he was awarded the Pour le Mérite order during the First World War. With the exception of princely families, this is the only case in which father and son received the highest Prussian valor award.

Military career
After graduating from a humanistic Gymnasium on 28 September 1880 he enlisted in the 2nd Bavarian Heavy Cavalry Regiment as part of the Bavarian Army in Landshut. He was then made an ensign on March 29, 1881 and promoted to second lieutenant on November 23, 1882. From October 1, 1888 to September 30, 1891, Wenninger studied at the War Academy, which qualified him for the higher adjutantage and, secondarily, for the general staff. This was followed by an assignment to the equitation institute where he also received his promotion to premier lieutenant. In October he was transferred to the staff of the 2nd Cavalry Brigade in Augsburg as an adjutant. From September 24, 1895 Wenninger served on the general staff for three years, meanwhile being promoted to captain on October 28, 1897. This was followed by a year-long assignment to the staff of the I Royal Bavarian Corps before he returned to line duty as a company commander in the 5th Chevaulegers Regiment. This was followed by a tour on the staff of the 3rd Royal Bavarian Division in Landau. For two years from September 21, 1902, Wenninger worked as a teacher of military history and the history of the art of war at the War Academy, in the meantime he became a major on October 23, 1903 and then transferred again to the staff of the I Bavarian Corps. On April 19, 1906, he became a member of the study commission of the War Academy and at the same time was entrusted with the leadership of the 1st Bavarian Heavy Cavalry Regiment. Wenninger was formally appointed regimental commander on July 20, 1906; in this position promoted to Lieutenant Colonel on March 8, 1907, and to Colonel on March 7, 1909. As such he took command of the 6th Cavalry Brigade in Regensburg on September 24, 1909. He was appointed to the Great General Staff in Berlin on December 15, 1911, serving as Bavarian Military Representative. Here he also was Bavaria's deputy representative on the Federal Council. Wenninger was promoted to major general on March 7, 1912.

When World War I broke out he initially remained the Bavarian military representative as part of the Great Headquarters. In recognition of his services, Wenninger was awarded the Knight's Cross of the Order of Merit of the Bavarian Crown on September 27, 1914. Associated with this was the elevation to the personal nobility status and he was accordingly allowed to be known as "Ritter von Wenninger" after his entry in the nobility register.

After his promotion to lieutenant general on September 10, 1914, Wenninger became commander of the Bavarian Cavalry Division on November 7, 1914. He led the unit in the First Battle of Ypres and the subsequent trench warfare in Flanders. In March 1915, Wenninger took over command of the 3rd Royal Bavarian Division at Artois. In September and October the division was able to prevent multiple breakthrough attempts during the battles taking place near La Bassée and Arras. During the Battle of the Somme, the division defended the Martinpuich section of the Foureaux Forest. In April 1917 the division was on the Arras front south of the Scarpe. During the Battle of Arras, Wenninger succeeded in repelling three attacks by the English and stabilized his front sector.

For this achievement King Ludwig III rewarded Wenninger with the knighthood of the Military Order of Max Joseph on April 23, 1917. Shortly thereafter, Wilhelm II awarded him the Pour le Mérite on May 1, 1917.

On June 5, 1917 he was appointed commander of the XVIII Reserve Corps, which at the time was in front of Verdun. From here it was transferred to the Romanian Front in July and took part in the German summer offensive in August and September. During the breakthrough battle of Putna and Susita, his troops succeeded in taking Muncelul. Wenninger fell in the aftermath of the Battle of Mărășești on September 8, 1917.

References

Bibliography
Max Spindler (ed.), Walter Schärl: The composition of the Bavarian civil service from 1806 to 1918. Michael Lassleben publishing house, Kallmütz / Opf. 1955, p. 273.
Othmar Hackl: The Bavarian War Academy (1867-1914). CH Beck´sche Verlagsbuchhandlung, Munich 1989, pages. 602-603.
Hanns Möller: History of the knights of the order pour le mérite in the world war. Volume II: M-Z. Verlag Bernard & Graefe, Berlin 1935, pp. 488-489.
Rudolf Kramer, Otto Freiherr von Waldenfels: VIRTUTI PRO PATRIA. The Royal Bavarian Military Max Joseph Order. Self-published by the Bavarian Military Max Joseph Order, Munich 1966, pp. 185, 428.

1861 births
1917 deaths
Bavarian generals
German military personnel killed in World War I
German Army generals of World War I
Knights of the Military Order of Max Joseph
Recipients of the Pour le Mérite (military class)
Military personnel from Bavaria
People from Landshut (district)